M. I. Shanavas (22 September 1951 – 21 November 2018) was an Indian politician. He was the working president of the Kerala Pradesh Congress Committee and a Member of Parliament of the 16th Lok Sabha of India.

Biography

M. I. Shanavas represented the Wayanad constituency and was a member of the Indian National Congress. He was a member of the Kerala Pradesh Congress Committee since 1983. He won the 2009 Lok Sabha election from Wayanad.

Death 
Shanavas died on 21 November 2018 in Chennai, following complications from a liver transplant.

References 

|-

External links 

Malayali politicians
India MPs 2009–2014
Politicians from Alappuzha
1951 births
2018 deaths
People from Wayanad district
Indian National Congress politicians from Kerala
Lok Sabha members from Kerala
India MPs 2014–2019
Government Law College, Thiruvananthapuram alumni
Deaths from liver failure